Pradeep Gandhe is an  Indian badminton player. He was the national doubles champion and bronze medalist in mixed doubles twice.

Achievements

Asian Games

IBF International

References

Living people
Indian male badminton players
Indian national badminton champions
Asian Games medalists in badminton
Asian Games bronze medalists for India
Badminton players at the 1982 Asian Games
Medalists at the 1982 Asian Games
Year of birth missing (living people)